Agathodes is a genus of moths of the family Crambidae. The genus was first described by Achille Guenée in 1854.

Species
Agathodes bibundalis Strand, 1913
Agathodes caliginosalis Snellen, 1895
Agathodes designalis Guenée, 1854
Agathodes dufayi Rougeot, 1977
Agathodes incoloralis (Hampson, 1918)
Agathodes isabella Viette, 1989
Agathodes minimalis Hampson, 1912
Agathodes modicalis Guenée, 1854
Agathodes musivalis Guenée, 1854
Agathodes ostentalis (Geyer in Hübner, 1837)
Agathodes paliscia Turner, 1908
Agathodes rebeli Tams, 1935
Agathodes thomensis Castel-Branco, 1973
Agathodes transiens Munroe, 1960

References

External links
 Agathodes designalis on the UF / IFAS Featured Creatures Web site

Spilomelinae
Crambidae genera
Taxa named by Achille Guenée